The Oklahoma Office of Homeland Security (OKOHS) is an agency of State of Oklahoma that is responsible for reducing the State's vulnerability to acts of terrorism and for minimizing and recovering the damage caused by terrorist attacks. OKOHS is a division of the Oklahoma Department of Public Safety.

The Office is headed by a Director of Homeland Security who is appointed by the Governor of Oklahoma. The inaugural Director, Kerry Pettingill, was appointed by Governor Brad Henry in January 2004.  On February 10, 2011, Governor Mary Fallin appointed Kim Edd Carter as the second Director of OKOHS.

History
Recognizing the need for coordinated preparedness and security efforts after the Oklahoma City Bombing of the Alfred P. Murrah Federal Building in 1995, and more especially after the attack on the World Trade Centers, and Pentagon on September 11, 2001, Governor Frank Keating issued an executive order calling for the creation of the Interim Oklahoma Office of Homeland Security. In February 2002, the Oklahoma Legislature passed Senate Joint Resolution 42 and the Oklahoma Interim Office of Homeland Security was formally created.

1.2. 9/11:

In the wake of the September 11th attacks the need for defensive approach on American soil was seen, and along with the United States Department of Homeland Security, many states organized their own versions of Homeland Security agencies. After the Oklahoma State Senate passed Joint Resolution 42 in February 2002. The Oklahoma Office of Homeland Security was officially formed in July of that year, but was not its own agency and relied on other state agencies. In January 2004, Oklahoma Governor Brad Henry sent a letter to the U.S. Department of Homeland Security designating the Office as the State Administrative Agency (SAA) - the single state agency responsible for the delivery of federal homeland security training, equipment funding and technical assistance. In April 2004, the Legislature passed House Bill 2280 - the Oklahoma Homeland Security Act. Governor Brad Henry signed the bill and formally created the standalone agency - the Oklahoma Office of Homeland Security.

Objectives
The strategic objectives of  the Office, as established in state statute, are: 
To prevent terrorist attacks
To reduce vulnerability to terrorism
To minimize the damage from and to recover from terrorist attacks
Such other duties as the Governor may prescribe.

Following its creation, Governor Brad Henry designated the Oklahoma Office of Homeland Security as the State Administrative Agency of all United States Department of Homeland Security grant programs funds.

Leadership
According to the Oklahoma Homeland Security Act, the Governor of Oklahoma is the chief officer of OKOHS. The Governor is responsible for appointing a Director of Homeland Security to oversee the day-to-day operations of OKOHS. The current Director of Homeland Security is Kim Edd Carter, who was appointed by Governor Mary Fallin in February 2011.

Director Carter a veteran of law enforcement with more than 32 years of experience.  Carter served as the fusion center coordinator and program manager for information sharing at the OKOHS before his appointment.  Before joining the Oklahoma Office of Homeland Security in 2007, Carter spent 26 years with the Oklahoma State Bureau of Investigation.  During his tenure at OSBI, he achieved the rank of assistant director of the investigative division where he managed more than 100 employees, including law enforcement officers and civilian employees.  Prior to joining OSBI, Carter was a patrol officer with the Oklahoma City Police Department.

National Emergency Management System (NIMS)
 This is a program that was organized and created along with the OKOHS. This program is done in part of cooperating with the federal government (which is required to use the NIMS framework in effort to aide and support state and local authorities), and other states in effort of national homeland security. It is the first-ever standardized approach to incident management and response. Developed by the United States Department of Homeland Security and put into action in March 2004, it establishes a uniform set of processes and procedures that emergency responders at all levels of government will use to conduct response operations. The National Incident Management System (NIMS) integrates effective practices in emergency response into a comprehensive national framework for incident management. The purpose of this program is to enable federal, state, and local authorities to respond to any domestic incident regardless of its urgency, size of the threat.

Divisions
Administration
Awareness & Preparedness
Grants & Finance
Interoperable Communications Planning
Prevention & Intelligence
Response & Recovery Planning

Regional Response System

- Agricultural Response Unit:

Overview

This unit is operated, and equipped with cooperation with the State Agricultural Department. They're equipped with eight mobile cleaning and disinfecting units that are located in areas across the state in effort to make response and elimination of agricultural disasters and/or an animal disease outbreak. The teams that are organized will operate and man the mobile units during any state of emergency regarding animal diseases, or major agricultural disasters. In addition, one decontamination unit can be used to clean and disinfect equipment used during other Regional Response System emergencies.

Capabilities

Their capabilities include: disinfecting contaminated equipment from an animal or plant disease outbreak; the decontamination of equipment in a hazardous materials incident, and the rehabilitation shelter for first responders

Team Information 

They consist of teams with a minimum of six team members. Each member is IFSAC-Certified to NFPA 472 Hazardous Materials Operations level, and are also trained in Agriculture Response and Biological Agent.

- Intermediate CBRNE Units:

Overview

There are 13 Intermediate CBRNE Units throughout the state. Each unit is equipped with a 38-foot trailer with a  multi-use tow vehicle that can be disconnected and used for transport of authorities and/or equipment. Additional fixed equipment includes a command and research center, laptop computers, satellite receiver, a light tower, a generator and an interoperable communications system.

Capabilities

There is a wide range of capabilities that each unit possesses. These include the ability to set up quarantine zones and interoperable communications; as well as possessing the equipment, and guide books, needed to identify a wide range of chemicals. Along with this, they possess materials needed to hold and transport dangerous and harmful liquids and gasses safely. They are able to conduct decontamination, gross and technical, on the spot. They have the ability to initialize basic emergency procedures, and act as the command center for authorities in any and all emergency events that require their assistance.

Team Information

Each team is made up of nine members, seven of which are required to be IFSAC-Certified to the NFPA 472 Hazardous Materials Technician Level; and two of which are required to be IFSAC-Certified to the NFPA 472 Hazardous Materials Operations Level.

- Intermediate Technical Rescue Units:

Overview

There are 10 Intermediate Technical Rescue Units across the state. Each unit is equipped with a 38-foot trailer, a tow vehicle (such as the one utilized by the CBRNE units), and a small emergency vehicle - a multi-use trailer with a 44-horsepower diesel engine - along with a 20 KW generator for each unit; tower lighting used for mass operations. Fixed equipment includes a full range of hydraulic core technology extrication tools, two 900-watt light towers, a breathing air compressor system, four cascade air tanks and storage for additional equipment.

Capabilities

There are a wide range of capabilities that each unit possesses. These include the ability to set up structural collapse operations and interoperable communications with other units; conduct high angle rescue, and conduct rescue operations in confined spaces. They have the ability to provide O2, cascade systems, and electrical power to other units. They have the ability to initialize basic emergency procedures, and act as the command center for authorities in any and all emergency events that require their assistance.

Team Information

Each team is made up of nine members - each of which has to be trained to IFSAC-Certified to NFPA 472 Hazardous Materials Operations level; to NFPA 1670 Structural Collapse Operations level; and in Ropes Rescue I & II, Trench Rescue, Confined Space, and Vehicle and Machinery Extrication Operations.

- Logistical Support Response Unit:

Overview 

There is only one Logistical Support Response Unit and it is located at the Oklahoma State University Fire Service Training in outside Stillwater. They are equipped with a tractor-trailer that contains a large air compressor, a large cache of self-contained breathing apparatus (SCBA) and extra SCBA cylinders. Their primary objective is to provide logistical support to other responding teams and authorities responding to emergencies.

Capabilities

Their capabilities include providing breathable air and refill cylinders, along with a cascade system to other responding units. Their generators allow for them to provide power and electrical backup to other responding authorities; along with tower lighting and long-range communication abilities. This unit is also in possession of additional personal protective equipment, or PPE, for large emergency events.

Team Information

This team is made up of twelve members who are all required to be IFSAC-Certified to the NFPA 472 Hazardous Materials Operations Level.

-Mass Decontamination Units:

Overview 

There are two Mass Decontamination units located in Tulsa and Oklahoma City. Each unit is composed of a self-driven machine that contains a decontamination rig inside. Each unit also contains a generator with the ability to produce hot water and external showers with decontamination capabilities.  This unit is closely utilized with CBRNE units, though not especially for their use only.

Capabilities

The name provides a majority of their capabilities as they are used for primarily decontaminating victims of emergencies and first responders at a rate of 150-200 persons per hour. They provide a rest and recovery center, along with the ability to provide medical treatment if necessary, and they can act a personnel staging area for authorities and responders.

Team Information 

Each team consist of ten members, each of which is required to be IFSAC-Certified to the NFPA 472 Hazardous Materials Operations Level

-Mobil Agricultural Laboratory:

Overview

This unit is owned and operated by the State Department of Agriculture, Food and Forestry (ODAFF). They received a Mobile Laboratory to assist the Agriculture Response Units in managing an incident. This laboratory can assist in other emergencies as well. The mobile laboratory can be deployed into the field for onsite testing of samples by state laboratory technicians during an animal or plant disease outbreak or other emergency.

Capabilities

This unit acts as its own command post for on-site testing for diseases (both animal- and agricultural-based), and as a rest and recovery center for first responders.

-Mobil Communications and Command Units:

Overview 

There are three Mobile Communications and Command Units - Command-1, Command-2 and Command-3.  All three units are set up for each to handle multiple different emergencies over multiple different jurisdictions. Each unit is staffed with several team members. Team members represent multiple agencies and possess communications, electronics and computer operations experience and have been trained to use the sophisticated computer and communications equipment on the units.

Command-1:

Command- 1 is owned and operated by the Oklahoma Highway Patrol. It has the capabilities to bridge communications and radio transmissions for different cities, counties, and statewide emergency communications systems. This unit is composed of an 18-wheeler that functions as a central communications and command hub for responders in major statewide disasters.

Command-2

The Oklahoma Highway Patrol owns and operates Command-2. Its primary functions to provide on-site broadband Internet through and onboard satellite link, a satellite and cellular phone communications rapid deployable radio communications for on-site cross-band radio net integration for VHF/UHF/800 MHz, military and amateur radio. This unit consists of only a 2008 Ford F350 with a camper attachment with onboard generator, and the ability to operate on a standalone basis due to their own power output and the ability to traverse off-road.

Command-3

Command-3 is owned and maintained by the Department of Agriculture. This unit is a Chevrolet Silverado 3500HD 4WD pickup truck containing a large communications camper-style shell. They are equipped with multiple VHF, UHF and 800 MHz public safety radio systems, mobile repeaters, a mobile satellite communications system and telephone systems, among other capabilities. This unit's design allows for the transport of minimal personnel on rugged and off-road terrain, and the ability to operate in confined areas.

-Regional CBRNE Units:

Overview

There are five Regional CBRNE units located along I-40. Each of the Regional CBRNE Units is a forty-foot, self-driven apparatus. Fixed equipment on the unit includes a command and research center, laptop computers, a generator and an interoperable communications radio system.

Capabilities

The capabilities of this unit closely mirror those of the Intermediate CBRNE Units, only on a smaller scale than that of the Intermediate units.

Team Information 

Each team holds a minimum of twenty members; fifteen are required to be IFSAC-Certified to the NFA 472 Hazardous Materials Technician Level. Five of which are IFSAC-Certified to the NFPA 472 Hazardous Materials Operations Level

-Regional Emergency Medical Services System:

Overview

This unit was developed by the Homeland Security Regional Response System. Its primary objective is to provide medical equipment, personnel, and a means of transport during large statewide emergencies. There are currently 33 units strategically placed throughout the state. There are three types of units: the Bantam EMS, the Medium EMS and the Large EMS.

Capabilities

Bantam EMS Units

There are sixteen of these units throughout the state; each with the capabilities of treating upwards to twenty-five people with medical supplies and equipment. They're equipped with O2 reserves and backboards as well. It is versatile in the sense that it can be easily attached to any pickup, or vehicle with a trailer hitch.

Medium EMS Units

There are fifteen of these units throughout the state; each has the capabilities to treat upwards of 100 people with medical supplies and equipment inside a temperature-controlled trailer, enabled with H.E.A.R.S. radios, generators, and outdoor lighting.

Large EMS Units

There are only two large EMS units in the state, each is capable treating upwards to 200 people with medical supplies and equipment. They possess onboard O2 supplies, along with satellite communications. It is the only unit to act as a command post for other units and authorities.

Additional Support

Additional support is provided by the Oklahoma Highway Patrol allowing them to utilize the Emergency Medical Service Unit (EMSU) to augment the Regional DMR teams. These troopers will provide triage, treatment and security assistance during a response. Oklahoma Highway Patrol has assigned 20 troopers to the regional teams.

Ambulance Strike Teams 

There at five Advance Life Support ground ambulances that hold two personnel on board; there is one team leader per vehicle, one of which is required to be an ALS provider that is either Paramedic or EMT-1 certified. There are five basic life support ambulances with two personnel each, both who are EMT-Basic certified.

-Small Decontamination Units:

Overview 

There are twenty-four SD units throughout the state. Each unit is a fourteen-foot trailer that comes equipped with a decontamination tent (that can double as a rest and recovery area) and other decontamination materials meant only for small areas, or people. Each trailer also holds electric capabilities through use of a small generator. These units are operated through, or in cooperation with the Intermediate CBRNE units to provide the decontamination of individuals and small areas. They are however not meant for the clean up of hazardous spills or large scale contamination.

Capabilities

They possess the ability to decontaminate people at 50/hour. They can act as a small command post, and a rehabilitation and staging area for authorities and first responders; as well as the ability to apply medical treatment to victims.

Team Information

Each team consist of six members who are all IFSAC-Certified to NFPA 472 Hazardous Materials Operations Level.

-Small Rescue Units:

Overview 

There are three units in across the state. Powered by a 44 horse powered diesel engine, each one is a small multi-use, self-contained trailer equipped with materials used for technical rescue, hydraulic core extraction tools, two light towers, an air compressor system that can allot for breathable air and four cascade air tanks.

Capabilities

Each unit's capabilities include the ability for rapid deployment, along with extrication equipment for accidents involving vehicles, agricultural, and industrial. Their lighted towers can light up large areas in order to aide in nighttime emergencies. These lighted towers are powered by their generators that be utilized for many different needs, including to power air filtration and other O2 needs.

Team Information 

Each unit holds six members each, all of which are required to be trained to NFPA 1670 Vehicle and Machinery Search and Rescue Operations level and Rope Rescue Operations level.

-Urban Search and Rescue:

Overview

There are two of these units in the state. Each unit has training and equipment in order to aide in FEMA responders, and other regional teams. Their equipment is also based on FEMA standards. They have the ability to conduct large scale rescue missions and events. They have equipment that rivals other emergency units; each unit possess a 42-foot trailer, with tow vehicles These units have similar training and equipment to the FEMA regional US&R teams, including high level rescue capabilities. Each unit includes a 42-foot trailer and tow vehicle; other equipment includes three quad-cab, four-wheel drive, one-ton trucks, a bobcat with attachments and a 27-foot enclosed trailer to transport the bobcat and any additional equipment.

Capabilities

These units have similar abilities to those of the Immediate technical rescue units; with the only addition being that of a canine search and rescue and handler.

Team Information

These units are the largest ones in the state, each consisting of 125 members from 33 different agencies around Tulsa and Oklahoma City. All members of each team are trained to the NFPA 1670 Structural Collapse Technician level, and certified in IFSAC-certified to the NFPA 472 Hazardous Materials Operations level. These teams also have specialized training in Medical Specialist, Technical Information Specialist, Structure Specialist, Heavy Equipment and Rigging Specialist, Technical Search Specialist, Canine Search Specialist, Logistic Specialist and Communications Specialist.

State Fusion Center
Fusion centers operate as state and major urban area focal points for the receipt, analysis, gathering, and sharing of threat-related information between federal; state, local, tribal, territorial (SLTT); and private sector partners.
The Office of Homeland Security is responsible for overseeing the State's Fusion Center. The Fusion Center serves as a central office for the detection, prevention, investigation and response to criminal and terrorist activity. Information collected by the various public safety and law enforcement agencies of the State is reviewed and analysized by the Center. As of 2011, the Center is administratively housed within the Oklahoma State Bureau of Investigation.

To assist the Office in overseeing the Center, Governor Brad Henry issued Executive Order 2007-41 which established a Governance Board over the Center. As of 2011, the Board is composed of the following members:

The current director of the State Fusion Center, as of 2017, is David Stenhouse.

See also
Oklahoma Department of Public Safety
Oklahoma Department of Emergency Management

References

External links
Office of Homeland Security website
Oklahoma Fusion Cebter website
OKOHS Red Dirt Ready
The Oklahoma Homeland Security Act

State law enforcement agencies of Oklahoma
State departments of homeland security of the United States
2004 establishments in Oklahoma